Shilton Paul (born 10 June 1988) is an Indian professional footballer who last played as a goalkeeper for I-League club Churchill Brothers.

Career

Mohun Bagan AC
After graduating from Tata Football Academy, Paul signed with I-League club Mohun Bagan in 2006. He got to play his first match in an AFC Cup encounter. Since his debut, Shilton has been an integral part of the Mohun Bagan team every year. Although an excellent goalkeeper, he sometimes got to play the second fiddle when the likes of Sangram Mukherjee, Sandip Nandy and Debjit Majumder were present in the team. He was handed over the Captaincy of Mohun Bagan in 2014 and led his side to victory in the 2014-15 I-League campaign.

Chennaiyin FC
In 2014 he joined Chennaiyin on loan from Mohun Bagan in first Indian Super League season, he went on to play four matches in the irst season of Indian Super League.

Kerala Blasters FC
Shilton represented Kerala Blasters FC in ISL Season 2.

Atletico De Kolkata
Shilton represented Atletico De Kolkata in ISL season 3 and that year Atletico De Kolkata emerged as the eventual champions under coach José Francisco Molina for the second time in the history of the Indian Super League.

Bhawanipore FC
Shilton joined Calcutta Football League side Bhawanipore F.C. in September 2020.

Churchill Brothers 
After 14 seasons with Mohun Bagan, Paul joined Churchill Brothers in July 2020 for a one-year deal. He made his debut for Churchill Brothers in their 5–2 win over Indian Arrows in the 2020–21 edition of the I-League on 11 January 2021.

International
He made 3 appearances for India in the 2006 AFC Challenge Cup and was on the bench for qualifiers for the 2007 Asian Cup.

He represented India in the 22nd JRD Tata Cup at Jamshedpur in 2003.

He represented India in the AFC Youth Championship(U-16) at Japan in 2004.

He represented India in the 10th South Asian Games at Colombo, Sri Lanka in 2006.

He represented India in the AFC Youth Championship at Kolkata in 2006.

Career statistics

Club

Honours

Club
Mohun Bagan
I-League (2): 2014–15, 2019–20
Federation Cup (3): 2006, 2008, 2015–16
Calcutta Football League (3): 2008, 2009, 2018
Sikkim Governors Gold Cup (1): 2017

Atletico de Kolkata
Indian Super League: 2016

Individual
I-League Best Goalkeeper Award (1): 2018
Mohun Bagan Player of the Year (1): 2018
Sports Journalist Best Player Award (1): 2018
Times Sports Man of the Year (1): 2019

References

External links
 Interview in Mohun Bagan Official Website, dated 10 October 2007

1988 births
Living people
People from North 24 Parganas district
Footballers from West Bengal
Indian footballers
I-League players
Mohun Bagan AC players
Association football goalkeepers
Indian Super League players
Chennaiyin FC players
Kerala Blasters FC players
ATK (football club) players
Churchill Brothers FC Goa players
Calcutta Football League players